Hossein Nouri (1931 – 1980) was an Iranian wrestler. He competed in the men's freestyle heavyweight at the 1956 Summer Olympics.

References

1931 births
1980 deaths
Iranian male sport wrestlers
Olympic wrestlers of Iran
Wrestlers at the 1956 Summer Olympics
Place of birth missing